El Nino is the third studio album by progressive metal band Eldritch, which was released in 1998.

Track listing
"Fall from Grace" – 2:06
"No Direction Home" – 7:04
"Heretic Beholder" – 5:04
"Scar" – 4:25
"Bleed Mask Bleed" – 4:37
"The Last Days of the Year" – 4:31
"From Dusk till Dawn" – 5:37
"To Be or Not to Be (God)" – 7:14
"El Nino" – 5:35
"Nebula Surface" – 6:05 (bonus track)

References 

1998 albums
Eldritch (band) albums